Oreobolopsis is a genus of flowering plants belonging to the family Cyperaceae.

Its native range is California, Western South America.

Species:

Oreobolopsis clementis 
Oreobolopsis inversa 
Oreobolopsis tepalifera

References

Cyperaceae
Cyperaceae genera